Eyes on the Prize: America's Civil Rights Movement is an American television series and 14-part documentary about the 20th-century civil rights movement in the United States. The documentary originally aired on the PBS network, and it also aired in the United Kingdom on BBC2.  Created and executive produced by Henry Hampton at his film production company Blackside, and narrated by Julian Bond, the series uses archival footage, stills, and interviews by participants and opponents of the movement.  The title of the series is derived from the title of the folk song "Keep Your Eyes on the Prize", which is used as the opening theme music in each episode.

The series won a number of Emmy Awards, Peabody Awards, and was nominated for an Oscar.

A total of 14 episodes of Eyes on the Prize were produced in two separate parts.  The first part, Eyes on the Prize: America's Civil Rights Years 1954–1965, chronicles the time period between the United States Supreme Court ruling Brown v. Board of Education (1954) to the Selma to Montgomery marches of 1965.  It consists of six episodes, which premiered on January 21, 1987, and concluded on February 25, 1987.  The second part, Eyes on the Prize II: America at the Racial Crossroads 1965–1985, chronicles the time period between the national emergence of Malcolm X during 1964 to the 1983 election of Harold Washington as the first African-American mayor of Chicago.  It consists of eight episodes, which aired on January 15, 1990 and ended on March 5, 1990. The documentary was made widely available to educators on VHS tape. All 14 hours were re-released on DVD in 2006 by PBS.

Broadcast
The film originated as two sequential projects. Part one, six hours long, was shown on PBS in early 1987 as Eyes on the Prize: America's Civil Rights Years 1954–1965. Eight more hours were broadcast in 1990 as Eyes on the Prize II: America at the Racial Crossroads 1965–1985.

In 1992, the documentary was released on home video.  By the mid-1990s, both rebroadcasts and home video distribution were halted for several years due to expiration of rights and licenses of copyrighted archive footage, photographs and music used in the series. Copyright holders were demanding increasingly higher rates. Grants from the Ford Foundation and Gilder Foundation enabled Blackside and the rights clearance team to renew rights in 2005. While the return of Eyes on the Prize to public television and the educational market depended on the contributions of many, four individuals in particular are credited with achieving the complicated undertaking of rights renewals and the re-release of the series: Sandra Forman, Legal Counsel and Project Director; Cynthia Meagher Kuhn, Archivist and Rights Coordinator; Rena Kosersky, Music Supervisor; and Judi Hampton, President of Blackside and sister of Henry Hampton. None of the archival material in the fourteen-hour documentary was removed or altered in any way.

PBS rebroadcast the first six hours on American Experience on three consecutive Mondays in October 2006, and rebroadcast the second eight hours in February 2008. After a gap of almost eight years, Eyes on the Prize was rebroadcast on World Channel on fourteen consecutive Sundays beginning on January 17, 2016.

PBS reissued an educational version of the series in the fall of 2006, making it available on DVD for the first time.  It is now available to educational institutions and libraries from PBS on seven DVDs or seven VHS tapes.  A consumer version of part one (1954–1965) was released in March 2010.

The licensing issues from 1993 to 2006 generated what was called Eyes on the Screen, an effort to disseminate the series by file sharing networks without regard to copyright restrictions.

Episodes

America's Civil Rights Years 1954–1965

America at the Racial Crossroads 1965–1985

Book
The book Eyes on the Prize: America's Civil Rights Years, 1954–1965 was created as a companion volume to the series during post-production by the producers and publishing staff at Blackside, Inc.  They were assisted by Juan Williams, a journalist with The Washington Post. First published by Viking Press in 1987, the book used a portion of the iconic photograph of the Selma to Montgomery march taken by Look magazine photographer James Karales on its cover.

Reception
The series has been hailed by numerous critics as more than just a historical document.

Awards
Both Eyes on the Prize and Eyes on the Prize II won Peabody Awards and Alfred I. duPont–Columbia University Awards.

The series also won six Emmy Awards.

Episode six, Bridge to Freedom, produced by Callie Crossley and James A. DeVinney, was nominated for an Academy Award for Best Documentary Feature in 1988 during the 60th Academy Awards.

See also
American Archive of Public Broadcasting
Civil rights movement in popular culture
 List of American Experience episodes
 List of American films of 1987
 List of American films of 1990

References

Further reading

External links
Eyes on the Prize I Interviews Collection, American Archive of Public Broadcasting
Eyes on the Prize Series
Teacher study guide
PBS Lesson Plans
Eyes on the Prize Interview Transcripts, Washington University Library
Eyes on the Prize I - Henry Hampton Collection, Washington University's Film and Media Archive
Eyes on the Prize II - Henry Hampton Collection, Washington University's Film and Media Archive

1980s American documentary television series
1987 American television series debuts
1987 in American television
1990 American television series endings
1990s American documentary television series
American Experience
Civil rights movement in television
Documentary films about African Americans
Documentary films about the civil rights movement
Historical television series
Peabody Award-winning television programs